Axt or AXT may refer to:
 Axtya, or Axt, an evil character in Zoroastrian mythology
 Helga Axt (born 1937), German chess master
 William Axt (1888–1959), American composer of film music
 Akita Airport (IATA code: AXT), an airport in Japan

See also 
 Akhts
 Harry Akst (1894–1963), American songwriter
 Albert Akst (1899–1958), and American musician turned film editor
 AHT (disambiguation)